Marble Slab Creamery  (Marble Slab) is an American chain of ice cream shops owned by FAT Brands. Its corporate offices are in Atlanta, Georgia.

There are more than 392 stores in various countries, all independently owned and franchised.

History 

Marble Slab, which began as a single unit operation called Cones & Cream, was founded in Houston by chefs Sigmund Penn and Tom LePage in 1983. They were inspired by Steve Herrell of Herrell's Ice Cream in Boston, who pioneered the mixing approach to ice cream toppings. In 1986, Marble Slab became the first ice cream treatery to use a frozen granite slab to blend mix-in toppings into the ice cream. Later that year, Marble Slab was bought by Ronnie Hankamer of Texas, who laid the groundwork for the brand's franchising concept.

In the late 2000s, Marble Slab expanded beyond its southeastern presence and has been recognized as a fast-growing franchise. In 2007 it was ranked in Entrepreneur Magazine's Franchise 500 (#93), Fastest-Growing Franchises (#72), and America's Top Global Franchises (#75).

As an independent company it had its headquarters in the Westchase area of Houston, Texas. After the NexCen acquisition, initially the brand's headquarters were in unincorporated Gwinnett County, Georgia. In July 2010, NexCen announced the sale of its franchise business to Global Franchise Group, LLC, an affiliate of Levine Leichtman Capital Partners. Global Franchise Group is now owned by Lion Capital LLP and Serruya Private Equity.

Ownership changes
In February 2007, Global Franchise Group purchased Marble Slab Creamery taking the company off the stock market, since its acquisition the chain has been a franchise brand with MaggieMoo's Ice Cream and Treatery and Great American Cookies.

After the NexCen acquisition, initially the brand's headquarters were in unincorporated Gwinnett County, Georgia. In July 2010, NexCen announced the sale of its franchise business to Global Franchise Group, LLC, an affiliate of Levine Leichtman Capital Partners. Global Franchise Group is now owned by Lion Capital LLP and Serruya Private Equity. 

On June 28, 2021, Global Franchise Group announced that it would be acquired by FAT Brands, owners of Fatburger and Johnny Rockets. The acquisition was completed on July 22.

Products 
The chain specializes in serving homemade ice cream. The chain serves a variety of other desserts including ice cream cakes, sundaes and milkshakes as well as smoothies.

References

External links 
 Official website

Ice cream parlors
Companies based in Fulton County, Georgia
Companies based in Houston
Fast-food franchises
Restaurants in Houston
Restaurants established in 1983
1983 establishments in Texas
2007 mergers and acquisitions